Upper Affcot is a hamlet in Shropshire, England.

It is located on the A49 north of Craven Arms and south of Church Stretton, between the hamlets of Strefford and Felhampton. There is a public house here, formerly called the Travellers Rest, now the Affcot Lodge. It is part of the civil parish of Wistanstow.

References

Hamlets in Shropshire